Sodium perrhenate (also known as sodium rhenate(VII)) is the inorganic compound with the formula NaReO4. It is a white salt that is soluble in water.  It is a common precursor to other rhenium compounds.  Its structure resembles that of sodium perchlorate and sodium permanganate.

Preparation
It can be prepared by treatment of rhenium heptoxide with base or by ion exchange from the potassium salt.

Sodium perrhenate can be prepared from rhenium metal with hydrogen peroxide in the presence of base.
2 Re + 7 H2O2 + 2 NaOH -> 2 NaReO4 + 8 H2O

Reactions
It reacts with sodium in ethanol to give nonahydridorhenate.

Sodium perrhenate has been used as a precursor of rhenium nitrides (such as Re3N, Re2N, Re3N2, ReN2, ReN3, ReN4), which can be used as catalysts for ammonia synthesis and for hydro-denitrogenation.

It can be used to prepare Re2(CO)10.

References

Further reading

Sodium compounds
Perrhenates